James Riordan may refer to:
 James Riordan (actor) (born 1969), American actor
 James Riordan (author), music journalist, screenwriter, biographer of Jim Morrison 
 James Riordan (Iowa politician) (1949–2022), 20th-century Iowa legislator; see Iowa's 39th Senate district
 James Riordan (Wisconsin politician), 19th-century Wisconsin legislator
 James Riordan (writer-sportsman), British writer, football player and Russian scholar